Guy Gofete (born 18 April 1947) is a Belgian-born poet and writer. Gofete published his first book of poems in 1969. Since then he has worked as an editor at the publishing company Gallimard. Gofete's poetry has  been compared to Verlaine (of whom Gofete has written a fictional "biography") - the contemporary French poet Yves Bonnefoy remarked Gofete is an heir to Verlaine. A poet who very courageously has decided to remain faithful to his own personal life, in its humblest moments. He keeps things simple, he is marvelously able to capture the emotions and desires common to us all. Gofete is without question one of the best poets of the present moment in France.

Gofete's short fiction (récits) often reimagine historic figures - the poet Paul Verlaine in Verlaine d'ardoise et de pluie  (1995)  and again in L'autre Verlaine (2007) or the painter Pierre Bonnard through his muse Marthe in Elle, par bonheur et toujours nue (published in English as Forever Nude in 2008). For several years, the American poet and critic Marilyn Hacker has translated a number of his poems, which have appeared in The Paris Review, TriQuarterly,  Barrow Street, and Poetry London. A bilingual anthology of her translations of Gofete's poetry, Charlestown Blues , was published in 2007 by University of Chicago Press

In addition to his poetry and his fiction, Gofete is a prolific essayist and a critic who regularly contributes to the  Nouvelle Revue Française.

Awards
 1989 Mallarmé prize for Eloge pour une cuisine de province
 Grand Prix of the Académie française.
 2015 International Literary Award Novi Sad (International Novi Sad Literature Festival)

Selected poetry
 Quotidien rouge, 1971.
 Nomadie, 1979.
 Huit muses neuves et nues, poems about the photographs by Miloslav Stibor, 1983.
 Solo d'ombres, 1983.
 Prologue à une maison sans murs, 1983.
 Le dormeur près du toit, 1983.
 La vie promise, 1991,(translations from the Italian "La vita promessa")
 Le pêcheur d'eau, Ed. Gallimard, Paris, 1995, coll. Blanche. Rééd. 2001.
 Icarus, (with a bilingual translation by Tucker Zimmerman, 2000.
 Solo d'ombres précédé de Nomadie, 2003.
 L'adieu aux lisières, 2007

Selected fiction
 Partance, 1995.
 Verlaine d'ardoise et de pluie, 1996.
 L'ami du jars, 1997.
 Elle, par bonheur et toujours nue, 1998 published in English as Forever Nude in a translation by Frank Wynne
 Partance et autres lieux suivi de Nema problema, 2000.
 Un été autour du cou, 2001.
 Une enfance lingère, 2006.
 L'autre Verlaine, 2007.

NotesGuy Gofete,Sincère n°66,Dampicourt,1984
Jaques BOREL - Sur les poètes(J.Stéfan,G.Gofete),Seyssel,Champ Vallon,1998.
Benît CONORT - Guy Gofete : Verlaine,Le Nouveau Recueil n°40,Seyssel,Champ Vallon,1996.
Hédi Kaddour - Guy Gofete,Poètes français, Paris,ADPF / Ministère des Affaires étrangères,2000.
John TAYLOR : Guy Fofferre: Exploring an Exclusive Promised Life'' France Magazine n°54,2000.

References

1947 births
Belgian writers in French
Living people
Prix Valery Larbaud winners